Discodoris concinna is a species of sea slug, a dorid nudibranch, shell-less marine gastropod mollusks in the family Discodorididae.

This name is considered a "nomen dubium"

Distribution
This species occurs in European waters (as an introduced species) and in the Indian Ocean off Madagascar.

References

 Odhner, N.H.J. (1919). Contribution a la faune malacologique de Madagascar. Arkiv For Zoologi, K. Svenska Vetenskapsakademien 12(6). 52 pp, 4 pl.
 Gofas, S.; Le Renard, J.; Bouchet, P. (2001). Mollusca, in: Costello, M.J. et al. (Ed.) (2001). European register of marine species: a check-list of the marine species in Europe and a bibliography of guides to their identification. Collection Patrimoines Naturels, 50: pp. 180–213 
  Dayrat B. 2010. A monographic revision of discodorid sea slugs (Gastropoda, Opisthobranchia, Nudibranchia, Doridina). Proceedings of the California Academy of Sciences, Series 4, vol. 61, suppl. I, 1-403, 382 figs.

Discodorididae
Gastropods described in 1864